Pogorzele may refer to the following places:
Pogorzele, Greater Poland Voivodeship (west-central Poland)
Pogorzele, Lębork County in Pomeranian Voivodeship (north Poland)
Pogorzele, Sztum County in Pomeranian Voivodeship (north Poland)